Tectonatica violacea, is a common name the violet moon snail, is a species of predatory sea snail, a marine gastropod mollusk in the family Naticidae, the moon snails.

Description
The size of the shell varies between 12 mm and 25 mm.

Distribution
This species occurs in the Indo-West Pacific off the Mascarene Basin; also off the Philippines and Australia (Queensland)

References

 Sowerby, G.B. (1st) 1825. A catalogue of the shells contained in the collection of the late Earl of Tankerville : arranged according to the Lamarckian conchological system: together with an appendix, containing descriptions of many new species. London : printed by E.J. Stirling for G.B. Sowerby vii, 92 pp. + appendix of xxiv pp. + coloured plates. 
  Wood, W. 1828. Index Testaceologicus; or A Catalogue of Shells, British and Foreign, arranged according to the Linnean system. London : Taylor Supplement, pp. 1–59, pls 1-8. 
 Philippi, R.A. 1852. Die Gattungen Natica und Amaura. pp. 27–120 in Küster, H.C., Martini, F.W. & Chemnitz, J.H. (eds). Systematisches Conchylien-Cabinet von Martini und Chemnitz. Nürnberg : Bauer & Raspe Vol. 2. 
 Cernohorsky, W.O. 1971. The family Naticidae (Mollusca: Gastropoda) in the Fiji Islands. Records of the Auckland Institute and Museum 8: 169-208
 Kilburn, R.N. 1976. A revision of the Naticidae of Southern Africa and Moçambique (Mollusca). Annals of the Natal Museum 22(3): 829-884 
 Wilson, B. 1993. Australian Marine Shells. Prosobranch Gastropods. Kallaroo, Western Australia : Odyssey Publishing Vol. 1 408 pp.
 Kabat, A.R. 1996. Biogeography of the genera of Naticidae (Gastropoda) in the Indo-Pacific. American Malacological Bulletin 12(1/2): 29-35

External links
  Kabat A.R. (2000) Results of the Rumphius Biohistorical Expedition to Ambon (1990). Part 10. Mollusca, Gastropoda, Naticidae. Zoologische Mededelingen 73(25): 345-380

Naticidae
Gastropods described in 1825